The Opaque Brotherhood is the third studio album by American hip hop supergroup Dark Lotus. Released on April 15, 2008, it peaked at No. 4 on the Billboard Top Independent Albums chart, No. 45 on the Billboard 200, No. 45 on the Top Internet Albums chart and No. 23 on the Top R&B/Hip-Hop Albums chart. AllMusic reviewer Stewart Mason praised the album, writing "Nothing on The Opaque Brotherhood will convince anyone who isn't already a fan, but the tormented lyrics and matter-of-fact delivery remove a layer or two of distance and artifice from the band's familiar themes, and make them that much more disturbing as a result." A "Deluxe Edition" of the album was released in August 2008, adding four additional songs.

Track listing

References

2008 albums
Dark Lotus albums
Psychopathic Records albums